Frederick Bennett (born December 31, 1983) is a former gridiron football defensive back. He was drafted by the Houston Texans in the fourth round of the 2007 NFL Draft. He played college football at the University of South Carolina.

Bennett has been a member of the San Diego Chargers, Cincinnati Bengals, Arizona Cardinals, Calgary Stampeders and Saskatchewan Roughriders.

Early years
Bennett played high school football at Manning High School in South Carolina. He played football, basketball, and ran track. He was also selected to participate in the 2001 Shrine Bowl.

College career
Bennett played college football at the University of South Carolina. He finished his career with 108 tackles, nine interceptions, and was a two-time All-American selection.

Professional career

Houston Texans
Bennett was drafted by the Houston Texans in the 4th-round of the 2007 NFL Draft. He replaced the injured Dunta Robinson in his rookie season, recording 62 tackles and intercepting three passes.

San Diego Chargers
After being waived in August 2010, he was claimed by the Chargers and spent the first four games of the 2010 season as a backup and special teams player.

Cincinnati Bengals
After being cut by San Diego, Bennett was claimed on November 23, 2010 by the Cincinnati Bengals to replace injured cornerback Johnathan Joseph. Bennett was released on August 27, 2011.

Arizona Cardinals
On August 29, 2011, Bennett signed with the Arizona Cardinals. He was waived on September 2.

Calgary Stampeders
On May 22, 2012, Bennett signed with the Calgary Stampeders. In his first three seasons in the CFL, Bennett totaled 129 tackles, five special teams tackles, nine interceptions and one fumble recovery. Bennett was named a 2014 West Division All-Star and won a Grey Cup later that season. On February 3, 2015, Bennett and the Stamps agreed to a contract extension.

Saskatchewan Roughriders
On August 16, 2016, Bennett was traded, along with Jeff Hecht, to the Saskatchewan Roughriders for two negotiation-list players. He was released by the Roughriders on February 1, 2017.

Healthcare fraud case
Bennett was charged with one count of conspiracy to commit wire fraud and health care fraud, one count of wire fraud, and one count of health care fraud by the United States Department of Justice on December 12, 2019. He initially pleaded not guilty to the charges, but changed his plea to guilty by December 2020. By February 2022, he had been sentenced to 180 days of house arrest and ordered to perform 240 hours of community service.

References

External links
Saskatchewan Roughriders bio
Calgary Stampeders bio 
Houston Texans bio
South Carolina Gamecocks bio

1983 births
Living people
Players of American football from South Carolina
South Carolina Gamecocks football players
American football cornerbacks
Canadian football defensive backs
Players of Canadian football from South Carolina
Houston Texans players
San Diego Chargers players
Cincinnati Bengals players
Arizona Cardinals players
Calgary Stampeders players
Saskatchewan Roughriders players
People from Manning, South Carolina